Trick or Treat (also known as Ragman and Death at 33 RPM in foreign markets) is a 1986 American horror film by De Laurentiis Entertainment Group, starring Marc Price and Tony Fields, with special appearances by Gene Simmons and Ozzy Osbourne. The movie centers on a teenager who is haunted by the ghost of his rock hero. It is the directorial debut of actor Charles Martin Smith, who has a cameo in the film.

Plot
High school outcast Eddie Weinbauer is writing a letter to his hero, heavy metal musician Sammi Curr. A vulgar and infamous superstar, Sammi is a hometown hero of Eddie's town and an alumnus of Eddie's own Lakeridge High School. He puts the letter in an envelope and starts doing his chores. Watching the news at the same time, following a report on Sammi's being banned from returning to Lakeridge High to perform at the Halloween dance, Eddie is shocked to hear the worst words to reach his ears: Sammi Curr has died in a mysterious hotel fire. Eddie is completely devastated. He goes to his friend Nuke, a radio DJ who knew Sammi Curr personally. To take Eddie's mind off the death of his idol, Nuke gives Eddie the only copy of Curr's last and as-yet unreleased album Songs in the Key of Death on an acetate disc. Nuke has recorded the disc onto high quality tape and plans to play it in its entirety on-air at midnight on Halloween as a tribute because, according to Nuke, that was always Sammi's plan for the album's debut.

Once back home, Eddie falls asleep while listening to the record and has a strange dream about the fire that killed Sammi Curr. When he wakes up, he finds that the record is skipping, and after listening to it for a few seconds, he comes to realize that something is not quite right about the lyrics that the record is stuck on. Having previous experience with hidden lyrics, Eddie plays the record backwards, but receives more than he imagined: Sammi Curr is speaking to him from beyond the grave.

Sammi instructs Eddie on how to go about getting revenge on a group of bullies who make his school life a torment because Sammi was bullied constantly in high school and he wants to take the revenge on Eddie's bullies that he never got to take on his own. Eddie explains the situation to his best friend Roger, who is highly skeptical of the whole thing. At first the revenge is innocent enough, but before long, the plans start to become sinister, with the potential to cause physical harm and eventually building toward murder. Having no desire to take things so far, Eddie determines to sever ties with Sammi, but the dead rocker has no intention of letting that happen. When Eddie is alone in his room, Sammi causes some soda to spill on the record, initiating an electrical surge that gives him just the amount of energy he needs to escape out of the record and become able to complete his murderous plans without the help of another. Eddie smashes his record player and stereo system after a personal, face-to-face visit from Sammi, hoping to make sure he never sees the dead rocker in his room again.

After Eddie's cassette tape copy of the album puts his worst bully's girlfriend in the hospital simply from listening to it, Eddie recruits Roger to steal the tape from the bully's car, and orders its destruction. Out of naivety and ignorance to the severity of the situation, Roger lies to Eddie about the tape's destruction and instead plays it on his own stereo system, earning Roger a visit from Sammi Curr. Sammi orders Roger to play the tape of Songs in the Key of Death at the high school Halloween dance or die.

Roger does as he is told and goes to the dance to play the tape over the PA system. Eddie learns of the tape being played, and quickly attempts to reach the school to stop Sammi from causing any more damage. When a band called The Kickers takes the stage for their performance at the Halloween dance, Sammi literally explodes out of the lead singer's guitar amplifier and proceeds to steal the show. The delighted students think it is all a Halloween tribute to Sammi Curr, even as Sammi begins to fire electric bolts from the neck of his guitar, disintegrating audience members. After the first few deaths, panic erupts as the young revellers realize the danger is real, and Sammi wreaks havoc as the dance attendees flee in terror.

When Eddie reaches the school, ambulances and police cars surround the building. As he rushes to save Leslie, he comes across Tim (Eddie's bully). Eddie attempts to save Tim, but Tim ignores him and is killed by Sammi. He eventually finds Leslie, and the two try desperately to find the main circuit box. When they do, Sammi attacks them, but before Sammi can kill them, Roger knocks out the circuit box, cutting the school power and temporarily stopping Sammi. Eddie realizes that Sammi only can travel through radio signals. Eddie sets about destroying every radio he sees in an attempt to prevent Sammi from continuing his rampage, leading to a final confrontation between the young metal fan and his former idol. After reaching the radio station in a futile attempt to stop the midnight broadcast of Sammi's demonic album, Eddie succeeds in luring Sammi (in a cassette tape) into a police car and starts baiting him with insults until he breaks out and tries to attack Eddie from behind the car's security grill. Eddie drives to an unfinished bridge and speeds over the edge, launching the car into a river, short-circuiting the tape and destroying the malevolent rocker.

Cast
 Marc Price as Eddie Weinbauer
 Tony Fields as Sammi Curr	
 Lisa Orgolini as Leslie Graham 
 Doug Savant as Tim Hainey
 Elaine Joyce as Angie Weinbauer, Eddie's Mother
 Glen Morgan as Roger Mockus
 Clare Torao as Maggie Wong-Hernandez (as Clare Nono) 
 Gene Simmons as Nuke (cameo)
 Ozzy Osbourne as Rev. Aaron Gilstrom (cameo)
 Alice Nunn as Mrs. Sylvia Cavell (cameo)
 Charles Martin Smith as Mr. Wimbley (cameo)

Production
Blackie Lawless of W.A.S.P. originally was set to play Sammi Curr. Ozzy Osbourne plays a televangelist decrying the evils of heavy metal music. A film titled Lunch of the Dead is displayed on a marquee at a cinema. According to the Internet Movie Database, Lunch of the Dead does not exist as a movie, and therefore was an invention from the props department.

Special effects for the film were created by Kevin Yagher, who later provided the effects for Freddy Krueger and the Crypt Keeper from HBO's Tales from the Crypt. Yagher also has a cameo in the movie as the lead singer/guitarist for the band The Kickers, playing at the high school Halloween dance.

Scenes at Eddie's school (the fictional Lakeridge High School) were filmed at both Hoggard High School and New Hanover High School in Wilmington, North Carolina.

Gene Simmons originally was offered the role of Sammi Curr, but did not think much of the script and ultimately agreed only to a cameo as radio DJ Nuke. Simmons later said in an interview that he chose to play the role as Wolfman Jack, a childhood hero of his.

The title of Sammi Curr's unreleased album Songs in the Key of Death is a play on the title of Stevie Wonder's 1976 album Songs in the Key of Life.

Soundtrack

All Sammi Curr music was composed by the band Fastway and composer Christopher Young. In the stack of records where Eddie's mother looks, the last LP is a copy of Megadeth's Killing Is My Business... and Business Is Good!. Also in the stack are albums by Impaler, Exciter, Possessed and Savatage. On the walls in Eddie's room are posters of Judas Priest, Anthrax, Raven, Twisted Sister, Mötley Crüe, Ozzy Osbourne, Poison, and KISS. A picture of the band Lizzy Borden is on his locker at school. Co-composer Christopher Young later composed music for the movies Hellraiser, Hellbound: Hellraiser II, The Gift, Urban Legend, Ghost Rider, Spider-Man 3, Drag Me to Hell and The Uninvited.

Release
The film was released theatrically in the United States by De Laurentiis Entertainment Group in October 1986. It grossed $6,797,218 at the box office. It was released on VHS by Lorimar Home Video the following year.

The film was released on DVD in the United States by Platinum Disc Corporation in 2002.

In 2014, a three-disc collector's edition of Trick or Treat—containing an all-region Blu-ray disc, region 2 DVD, soundtrack CD, and booklet in digibook packaging—was released in Germany by NSM Records. This edition was limited to 1,500 copies—1,000 copies with cover art A and 500 copies with cover art B.

See also
List of ghost films

References

External links 
 
 
 Trick or Treat (1986) at The Croc's Domain

1980s American films
1980s English-language films
1980s ghost films
1980s supernatural horror films
1986 films
1986 directorial debut films
1986 horror films
American ghost films
American supernatural horror films
American teen horror films
De Laurentiis Entertainment Group films
Films directed by Charles Martin Smith
Films produced by Joel Soisson
Films scored by Christopher Young
Films shot in North Carolina
Films with screenplays by Joel Soisson
Halloween horror films
Heavy metal films